Chris Blanchard (born 22 April 1971), a Canadian former cross-country skier, competed in the 1998 Winter Olympics.

References

1971 births
Living people
Canadian male cross-country skiers
Olympic cross-country skiers of Canada
Cross-country skiers at the 1998 Winter Olympics